Jon Buller (born December 27, 1970) is a Contemporary Christian artist from Winnipeg, Manitoba, Canada. He now resides in Vernon, British Columbia, where he works as Pastor of Worship and the Arts at Vernon Alliance Church, a position he began in August 2005.  Buller founded Hear the Music Ministries (HTM) in 1999; HTM is "committed to discipling and developing emerging Christian musicians, expressing worship through music."

Jon has released nine albums, an EP, and a concert video.  In 2000, Jon Buller was nominated for a Juno Award for Best Gospel Album for his work, Sinner And The Saint. He received a 2006 Covenant Award for Praise & Worship Song of the Year, Lord of Every Thing.

Discography

Albums
 Mystified  (1993)
 That's What I'd Like (1996)
 Sinner and the Saint (1999, review)
 And Your Praise Goes On, Vol. 1 (1999)
 And Your Praise Goes On, Vol. 2 (2001)
 And Your Praise Goes On, Vol. 3 (2002, review)
 Broken Drum (2003, review) (Jon's cousins are featured)
 Best of Jon Buller Worship (2005, review)
 The Hymn Project - with Nolan Balzer and Kevin Aichele (Signpost, 2007)
 Light Up the Sky (Signpost, 2009)

Collaborations and other credits
 Vocals and acoustic guitar on Red Letterz by Fresh I.E. (2003)
 Singles - with Fresh I.E. (2008, EP)
 co-wrote "The Kingdom of Heaven" with Jacob Moon on Light Up The Sky (2009)
 co-wrote "Broken Beauty" with Bob Bennett on Light Up The Sky (2009)

Songs on compilations
 Sea to Sea: Filled With Your Glory, "Lord Of Everything" (CMC, 2004)

Video
 Hear The Music Live (2003, review)

Awards and recognition
GMA Canada Covenant Awards
 2005 Special Events/Compilation Album of the Year: Sea To Sea: Filled With Your Glory (Jon Buller et al.)
 2006 Praise And Worship Song Of The Year: "Lord Of Every Thing"
 2008 Classical/Traditional Album Of The Year: The Hymn Project (Buller, Balzer & Aichele)
 2010 for the 2010 Covenant Awards to be announced October 29, 2010 Buller received a nomination for Modern Worship Album Of The Year: Light Up The Sky

Juno Awards
 2000 nominee, Best Gospel Album: Sinner And The Saint

Western Canadian Music Awards
 2003 nominee, Outstanding Christian Recording: Broken Drum
 2008 nominee, Outstanding Contemporary Christian/Gospel Recording: The Hymn Project
 2010 for the 2010 WCM Awards to be announced October 24, 2010 Buller received a nomination for Contemporary Christian/Gospel Recording of the Year: Light Up the Sky

References

External links
 Official Jon Buller website
 Hear The Music Ministries
 

Canadian singer-songwriters
Canadian performers of Christian music
Musicians from Winnipeg
Living people
1970 births
21st-century Canadian male singers
Canadian male singer-songwriters
Canadian Mennonites
Mennonite musicians